Edward G. "Manny" Robinson Jr. (March 19, 1933 – February 26, 1974) was an American actor. He was the son of actor Edward G. Robinson and his wife Gladys Lloyd.

Life and career 
Edward G. Robinson Jr. appeared in 23 films and television series beginning in 1952 with Invasion USA. He appeared in Some Like It Hot (1959) as the murderer of George Raft's "Spats" Colombo character hiding inside the birthday cake. He appeared in television series Wagon Train, Laramie, Gunsmoke and Markham. His final role was in the 1971 television movie City Beneath the Sea.

Robinson was arrested for drunk driving in June 1956.

In 1958, Robinson published his autobiography, My Father, My Son, written with William Dufty.

Robinson married three times. He had a daughter, Francesca, by his first wife, Frances Chisholm.  In a 1968 paternity suit by secretary Lucille Kass, Robinson was adjudged to be the biological father of her daughter, Shawn, born June 7, 1966.

On February 26, 1974, Robinson was found unconscious by his wife, Nan, in their West Hollywood home. He was pronounced dead of a heart attack at age 40.

Filmography

References

External links

1933 births
1974 deaths
American people of Romanian-Jewish descent
Jewish American male actors
Male actors from Los Angeles
20th-century American male actors
Burials at Hollywood Forever Cemetery
20th-century American Jews